Koulamoutou Airport or Koula Moutou Airport  is an airport serving Koulamoutou, the capital of the Ogooué-Lolo Province in central Gabon.

The Koulamoutou non-directional beacon (Ident:KL) is located just north of the runway.

Facilities

Airlines and destinations

See also

 List of airports in Gabon
 Transport in Gabon

References

External links
OpenStreetMap - Koulamoutou
OurAirports - Koulamoutou

Airports in Gabon
Ogooué-Lolo Province